Michael Barrett (16 May 1816 – 26 February 1887) was a physician and teacher. He was born in London, England, received his early education at Caen, France and emigrated with his family to Upper Canada in 1833.

Barrett is best remembered for his role in the establishment of the Ontario Medical College for Women. Women were being denied admission to existing medical schools and an appeal to Barrett and other medical people by Augusta Stowe-Gullen resulted in the opening of the college in 1883. He received the appointment dean and also taught there until his death.

External links 
 Biography at the Dictionary of Canadian Biography Online

1816 births
1887 deaths
19th-century Canadian physicians
English emigrants to pre-Confederation Canada
Canadian university and college faculty deans
Scientists from London